North is a 2003 album by English singer-songwriter Elvis Costello. Contrasting with its rock-based predecessor When I Was Cruel (2002), North is an intimate album of ballads and torch songs using classical music and jazz idioms, partially inspired by the dissolution of his marriage to wife Cait O'Riordan and his burgeoning relationship with Diana Krall. It reached No. 44 in the UK Albums Chart, No. 57 in the US chart and No. 1 in the US Traditional Jazz chart.

Track listing
All songs written by Elvis Costello.

 "You Left Me in the Dark" – 3:26
 "Someone Took the Words Away" – 4:35
 "When Did I Stop Dreaming?" – 5:22
 "You Turned to Me" – 2:32
 "Fallen" – 3:12
 "When It Sings" – 3:58
 "Still" – 2:27
 "Let Me Tell You About Her" – 4:23
 "Can You Be True?" – 3:45
 "When Green Eyes Turn Blue" – 4:17
 "I'm in the Mood Again" – 2:34

 The UK and Japanese editions contain the bonus track "Impatience". The Japanese edition also contains another bonus track, "Too Blue".

Limited edition DVD
 "North" (Solo Live Performance) – 3:06
 "Still" (Studio Version Promo Video) – 2:44
 "Fallen" (Solo Live Performance) – 3:08

Charts
Album

References

External links
 

Elvis Costello albums
2003 albums
Albums produced by Elvis Costello